Kaizen costing is a cost reduction system used after a product's design has been completed and it is in production. Business professor Yasuhiro Monden defines kaizen costing as 

The Shogakukan Dictionary's original definition of Kaizen is translated as “The act or making bad points better”. In English, the more popular definition of Kaizen is “Change for Better”. Many believe that the Kaizen meaning is “continuous improvement” but, Kaizen is a result of continuous improvement. It exists at the employee's level. The employee's goal is to reach their potential, challenge the status quo and achieve continual improvement.

Prior to kaizen costing, when the products are under the development phase, target costing is applied. After targets have been set, they are continuously updated to display past improvements and the projected (expected) improvements.

Monden has described two types of kaizen costing:
 Asset and organization-specific kaizen costing activities planned according to the exigencies of each deal
 Product model-specific costing activities carried out in special projects with added emphasis on value analysis

Adopting kaizen costing requires a change in the method of setting standards.

Kaizen costing focuses on "cost reduction" rather than "cost control".

Types of cost under consideration
Kaizen costing takes into consideration costs related to the manufacturing stage, which include:
 Costs of supply chain
 Legal costs
 Manufacturing costs
 Waste
 Recruitment costs
 Marketing, sales and distribution
 Product disposal

References

External links
 Wawak S. (2016), Kaizen costing, CEOpedia

Costs
Japanese business terms